The leopard round stingray (Urobatis pardalis) or Central American round stingray and Costa Rican round stingray is a small species of round ray found in shallow waters off the coast from Costa Rica to Colombia in the eastern Pacific Ocean.

Taxonomy
The species name, pardalis, is from the leopard round stingray's dorsal patterning which resembles that of a leopard.

Distribution and habitat
This species is endemic to the Tropical Eastern Pacific, from Costa Rica to Colombia. They can be observed from the intertidal zone to a depth of around  inhabiting reefs, seagrass meadows, and sandy areas on continental shelves.

Description
The leopard round stingray has a circular body disc with a dorsum that lacks tubercles. Its dorsum also possesses a grayish or tan base coloration, dusky patches that usually form a honeycomb pattern, and small, and dark spots that vary in size. The ray's thick tail (which is shorter than its disc) is armed with a venomous tail spine.

Biology and ecology

This abundant, benthopelagic ray is probably nocturnal and is observed staying stationary during the day on reefs. The ray's diet consists of shrimp, small crabs and fish, and worms and it has a lifespan of 8 to 12 years.

Relationship to humans

The leopard round stingray is fairly harmless, yet it does pose danger to humans given its venomous tail spine. Despite this, they make their way into the aquarium trade. They are probably quite hardy in captivity although a single ray requires a minimum 200-gallon aquarium with abundant swimming room and heavy filtration. Divers are able to easily approach them in the wild if they stay calm and move slowly. The leopard round stingray may be misidentified as the Round stingray (Urobatis halleri) which has smaller spots that are generally the same size. It could potentially be more plentiful than the leopard round stingray as well. The Cortez round stingray (Urobatis maculatus) may also be misidentified as the leopard round stingray.

References

External links
 

Leopard round stingray
Western North American coastal fauna
Western South American coastal fauna
Leopard round stingray